The Last Mistress (literally "An old mistress") is a 2007 French-Italian film based on the novel Une vieille maîtresse by the French writer Jules Barbey d'Aurevilly. It stars Asia Argento and Fu'ad Aït Aattou as the two main characters. The movie was directed by the French filmmaker Catherine Breillat and was selected for the 2007 Cannes Film Festival.

Plot
In 1835 Paris, Ryno de Marigny (Fu'ad Aït Aattou), before marrying the young and innocent Hermangarde (Roxanne Mesquida), makes a last visit to La Vellini (Asia Argento), his Spanish mistress, to bid goodbye in an act of lovemaking. His liaison with La Vellini is the subject of Parisian gossip, and before Hermangarde's grandmother gives her blessing, she wants to hear from Ryno everything about this relationship. Ryno reveals a tempestuous story but indicates that his ten-year romance is over; he now is in love with Hermangarde. After the marriage, the newlyweds move away to a castle at the seashore. They are happy and soon Hermangarde conceives. But the "last/old mistress" reappears, and while Ryno tries to keep her out of his life, she is not to be rejected, and Hermangarde finds out about it.

Cast
Asia Argento as La Vellini 
Fu'ad Aït Aattou as Ryno de Marigny 
Roxane Mesquida as Hermangarde 
Claude Sarraute as la marquise de Flers 
Yolande Moreau as la comtesse d'Artelles 
Michael Lonsdale as le vicomte de Prony 
Anne Parillaud as Mme de Solcy 
Jean-Philippe Tessé as le vicomte de Mareuil 
Sarah Pratt as la comtesse de Mendoze 
Amira Casar as Mademoiselle Divine des Airelles
Lio as The singer
Isabelle Renauld as l'arrogante 
Léa Seydoux as Oliva 
Nicholas Hawtrey as Sir Reginald 
Caroline Ducey as la dame de Pique 
Jean-Claude Binoche as le comte de Cerisy 
Thomas Hardy as le valet de Mareuil 
Jean-Gabriel Mitterrand as le valet de Rigny 
Eric Bouhier as le chirurgien 
Frédéric Botton as le cardinal de Flers

Critical reception
The movie was well received by the critics. It appeared on some critics' top 10 lists of the best films of 2008. Stephen Holden of The New York Times named it the fifth best film of the year, and Sheri Linden of The Hollywood Reporter named it the ninth best.

Rotten Tomatoes reports that 77% of 98 critics gave the film a positive review, for an average rating of 6.7/10. The site's consensus states that "More complicated than your average bodice ripper, Catherine Breillat's Last Mistress features beautiful costumes, wrought romances, and a feral performance from Argento." Metacritic gave the film a score of 78 out of 100, based on 25 critics.

References
Notes

Bibliography
Blateau,Anne-Élisabeth. "Une vieille maîtresse sans Breillat" (A Last Mistress without Breillat), in Carré d'Art : Barbey d'Aurevilly, Byron, Dalí, Hallier, by Jean-Pierre Thiollet, Anagramme éd., Paris, 2008, pp. 143–149.

External links

Une vieille maîtresse at Films de France
Cannes Festival press kit

2007 films
2000s historical films
Erotic romance films
Films based on French novels
Films based on works by Jules Barbey d'Aurevilly
Films directed by Catherine Breillat
French historical films
Italian historical films
Films set in the 1830s
2000s French films